Lucieni is a commune in Dâmbovița County, Muntenia, Romania with a population of 6,232 people. It is composed of two villages, Lucieni and Olteni. It also included three other villages from 1968 to 2004, when they were split off to re-establish Raciu Commune.

References

Communes in Dâmbovița County
Localities in Muntenia